Weldon Park is a  biological Site of Special Scientific Interest east of Weldon in Northamptonshire.

This ancient woodland is mainly ash, maple and hazel. It has diverse flora, especially on grassland rides, and unusual plants on the wettest soils. Insects include the uncommon purple emperor butterfly.

References

Sites of Special Scientific Interest in Northamptonshire